The Mankato Marathon is an annual marathon race in Mankato, Minnesota, that was first run in 2010. The race weekend now brings nearly 5,000 runners to the city for several races: the marathon, a marathon four-person relay, a half marathon, a 10K run, a 5K run, children's runs. The race course is certified by the USATF, making it a qualifying race for the Boston Marathon.

The race is held in mid-October, when the hardwood forests of the Minnesota River valley turn bright with color. Although the city is known for its steep hills, the course winds around them and features only gradual climbs and downhills as it moves through many neighborhoods, two country roads and the downtown. The marathon begins at Minnesota State University, Mankato,  makes two loops through the city, and finishes on historic Front Street.

The marathon weekend is now one of the major events in southwest Minnesota. 

As with most modern marathons, many runners raise money for charity. The marathon organizers help coordinate with local non-profit organizations for fundraising leading up to and during the event. In 2019, $15,000 was raised.

Mayo Clinic Health System is the main sponsor of the race, though at its 2010 genesis, Hy-Vee sponsored the race. 

The race is owned and managed by Visit Mankato (the tourism branch of Greater Mankato Growth).

In 2017 and 2018, the website Bibrave named the Mankato Half Marathon as one of the best in the United States. The editors noted the fall scenery, the support, and the paved trails as winning features.

Broadcast coverage of the weekend is provided by KATO-FM (93.1) and KDOG-FM (96.7).

Race weekend
The race weekend begins with a sports and health exposition, which is sponsored by Scheels and is held in the Myers Field House at Minnesota State University, Mankato. The day before the marathon, there are races for children and a 5K race around the MSU campus. On marathon race day, the other three races begin in the morning from the campus, near Blakeslee Stadium. The 10K starts the day, and an hour later, the marathon and half marathon take off in a combined start. Runners can also do the marathon as a four-person relay team.

Pacers are provided for both the full and half marathon.

After the races, there is a post-race party near the Mayo Clinic Health System Event Center with live music, food and drinks.

Marathon course
In 2019, the course underwent a shift to more neighborhood streets and less long, straight stretches along agricultural fields.
  
The marathon course starts in downtown Mankato, and runs through several neighborhoods in the city, winding around quaint blocks with some cheering residents. It also takes runners on the Red Jacket Trail, around Mount Kato, near Sibley Park, along the Blue Earth River and the Minnesota River (though it is hidden by the levy walls), through the 1890s era downtown and past the Hubbard House, and down two rural roads. The finish is on Front Street, near the Mayo Clinic Health System Event Center, where several restaurants and bars are also located. The largest descent in the course is at mile 18. The course is a certified marathon distance (USATF #MN19070RR).

Prizes
In 2018, the first place winners received $250 and a trophy made of Kasota stone from the Kasota-Mankato quarries.

History
The race was initially envisioned as a combination athletic and art fair event. However, city leaders felt that either event might outgrow one weekend, so the race was delegated to the regional tourism office, Visit Mankato. The office partnered with Final Events, owned by Mark Bongers. The two entities shared ownership of the race weekend. The race weekend was set later in the year to avoid competing with the seven other Minnesota marathons, and also to serve as a "last shot" for a Boston-qualifying race in the state.

The inaugural race was sponsored by Hy-Vee and the race weekend included just three races: The marathon, the half, and a 10K. The initial participation exceeded expectations: Race applications had to be turned away as 2,000 total entries (for the three races) filled early. The marathon was capped at 800 runners.

A light rain fell as the race began, but it cleared up, and the wind was not a factor in the race as some feared.

James Sorenson graduated from Gustavus Adolphus College in 2005, where he ran cross country and track, and he decided to run the inaugural race. the Gustie won the race in 2:37:04. Jen Blue, a Minnesota State Mankato coach for the track and field team, won for women in 3:06:29. It was her fourth marathon.

For the half, 1,100 runners signed up. John VanDanacker of Greenfield, Minnesota, a veteran runner and Medtronic employee who had run for University of Minnesota Duluth cross country and track in the 1980s, won. A 32-year-old Janesville, Minnesota, mother of three, Elisa Johnson, won the woman's title in 1:27:36.
350 runners took to the 10K course.

In 2011, 3,800 runners raced. And the 5K was added. The finish line shifted slightly, and Mayo Clinic became the main sponsor.  

In 2014, before the race, 56-year-old North Mankato, Minnesota, resident Brian Mechler called emergency dispatchers to tell them an anonymous person planted four bombs on the marathon race route. The course was searched by local police and bomb-sniffing dogs from the Twin Cities. It was found to be safe, though more officers were added to the event security team for the marathon day. Mechler was arrested and in court, he pleaded innocent to charges of terroristic threats. Regardless, the court found him guilty. He served jail time and received mental health treatment. 

In 2019 the course was rerouted to avoid the longer country roads. Instead, the weaving new path took runners through the neighborhoods. Most praised the change, but the following year, few runners would get a chance to try it again.

By the summer of 2020, Grandma's Marathon and the Twin Cities Marathon had already announced cancelations due to the COVID-19 pandemic, but it wasn’t until August that the Mankato race announced it would not be run in 2020. Participants were given the opportunity to run their own course and submit their times.

Marathon race results

Key:

All cities in Minnesota unless indicated otherwise

*A "virtual" race was scheduled.

Half marathon race results

Key:

All cities in Minnesota unless indicated otherwise

*A "virtual" race was scheduled.

References

External links

Mankato Marathon YouTube channel
Mankato Marathon Flickr albums

Foot races in Minnesota
Marathons in Minnesota
Marathons in the United States
Recurring sporting events established in 2010